James Henry "Hub" Hart (February 2, 1878 – October 10, 1960) was a Major League Baseball catcher who played for the Chicago White Sox from 1905 to 1907. Hart played college football as  halfback at Boston College and Georgetown University.

Georgetown
James Hart was born in Everett, Massachusetts, in 1878. In 1901, he enrolled at Georgetown University to study dentistry and was also a star running back and end on the football team for four years. Prior to Georgetown he shortly attended Boston College with fellow Georgetown back Joseph Reilly.

Football
On November 16, 1901, he solidified himself in Georgetown football history by scoring all three of his team's touchdowns in a 17–16 win over the University of Virginia. He was selected All-Southern in 1901. Hart was named team captain in 1903. That season, he had a 99-yard run from scrimmage against Maryland; this is still a school record. His nickname, "Hub", originated from his central position on most of the team's plays. He was elected to the Georgetown Hall of Fame.

Baseball
Hart also played on the baseball team as a right fielder and catcher. He was considered the best college catcher in the country.

Major League Baseball
After earning his degree in 1905, he was signed by the American League's Chicago White Sox. He made his professional debut on July 16, 1905. During the 1905 season, he played in 11 games and batted .100.

In 1906, Hart hit .162 for Chicago and .247 for the American Association's Minneapolis Millers. He returned to the White Sox in 1907 and batted a respectable .271. However, that was his last major league season. From 1908 to 1912, he played in the minor leagues. He set a career-high in batting average in 1909, hitting .307 for the Montgomery Climbers of the Southern Association.

After retiring from baseball, Hart became a dentist. He served as the head football coach at Boston College in 1910, compiling a record of 0–4–2. He died of a heart attack in 1960.

MLB batting statistics

Head coaching record

References

External links

1878 births
1960 deaths
American football halfbacks
Major League Baseball catchers
Boston College Eagles football coaches
Boston College Eagles football players
Chicago White Sox players
Georgetown Hoyas football players
Minneapolis Millers (baseball) players
Montgomery Climbers players
Utica Utes players
Manistee Champs players
Sacramento Sacts players
All-Southern college football players
Sportspeople from Everett, Massachusetts
Coaches of American football from Massachusetts
Players of American football from Massachusetts
Baseball players from Massachusetts